Christian Erik Maråker (born 24 September 1982) is a Swedish basketball player for Borås Basket of the Basketligan. A 6'9" center/power forward, he played college basketball in the United States at the University of the Pacific from 2002 to 2006.

Career
Maråker attended Sanda Gymnasium in Huskvarna, Sweden. After his second season at Sanda, he moved to the Sodertalje Club Team. He earned all-star honors at both the Under 20 Swedish Championships in 2001 and the Junior Swedish Championships in 2000. He also earned Stadium Cup Most Valuable Player honors in 2001. At the 2001 Stockholm Club Tournament, Maråker scored 26 points in the championship game against the Solna Club team from Stockholm. He played for two years with the Swedish Under 20 National Team.

At Pacific he averaged 17.6 points, 8.9 rebounds and 2.2 assists per game.  He was the 2005-2006 Big West Conference Player of the Year, and was only the sixth player to be named first-team All-Big West three times in his career.

He was listed as a sleeper pick in the 2006 NBA draft. Some experts thought he might get picked up by the Utah Jazz, but went undrafted.

Shortly after the 2006 NBA Draft, Maråker was invited as an undrafted free agent to play for the Sacramento Kings team in the NBA Summer League in Las Vegas, Nevada. He ended up playing in seven games over two seasons for the Kings in the NBA Summer League, scoring a total of 27 points.

On August 16, 2006, Maråker signed to play in the EuroLeague with Union Olimpija.

Honours 
Pacific Tigers

Big West Conference Champion
2004, 2006
All-Big West Player of the Year
2006
Big West All-Tournament Team
2006

References

External links
Euroleague player page
Union Olimpija bio 
Official Swedish national team stats 

1982 births
Living people
Basket Zaragoza players
Borås Basket players
Centers (basketball)
KK Olimpija players
Levanga Hokkaido players
Norrköping Dolphins players
Pacific Tigers men's basketball players
People from Varberg
Power forwards (basketball)
Södertälje Kings players
Sun Rockers Shibuya players
Swedish expatriate basketball people in Japan
Swedish expatriate basketball people in Spain
Swedish expatriate basketball people in the United States
Swedish men's basketball players
Tenerife CB players
Swedish expatriate sportspeople in Japan
Sportspeople from Halland County